Larsen , is a Danish-Norwegian patronymic surname, literally meaning "son of Lars" (equivalent of Laurentius). It is the seventh most common surname in Denmark, shared by about 2.4% of the population.

Larsen may refer to:

In engineering
 Henning Holck-Larsen (1907–2003), Danish co-founder of the Indian engineering firm Larsen & Toubro
 Gunnar Larsen (politician) (1902–1973), Danish chemical engineer, businessman and politician

In exploration
 Carl Anton Larsen (1860–1924), Norwegian Antarctic explorer
 Henry Larsen (1899–1964), Canadian Arctic explorer
 Torry Larsen (born 1971), Norwegian adventurer and Arctic explorer

In music
 Brian Larsen (born 1986), American singer-songwriter and producer
 Kim Larsen (1945–2018), Danish rock musician
 Libby Larsen (born  1950), American composer
 Magnus Larsen, bass guitar player for Norwegian pop/rock band Di Derre
 Marit Larsen (born 1983), Norwegian singer and songwriter
 Micheal Larsen (1981–2010), known as Eyedea, American musician, rapper and poet
 Tutta Larsen (born 1974), Russian singer
 Jon Larsen born 1959, Norwegian gypsy jazz guitarist, record producer, painter, and amateur scientific researcher
 Jon Larsen (Danish musician) born 1970, Danish musician, best known as the drummer for Volbeat
 William Wiik Larsen born 1986, Norwegian Grammy-nominated record producer, songwriter and multi-instrumentalist
 Neil Larsen born 1948, American jazz keyboardist, musical arranger and composer
 Blaine Larsen born 1986, American country music artist

In sports and games
 Art Larsen (1925–2012), American tennis player
 Bent Larsen (1935–2010), Danish chess player
 Blair Larsen (born 1969), New Zealand rugby player
 Brad Larsen (born 1977), Canadian ice hockey player
 Don Larsen (1929–2020), American baseball player
 Edvard Larsen (1881–1914), Norwegian triple jumper
 Ernst Larsen (1926–2015), Norwegian athlete
 Gary Larsen (born 1942), American football player
 Gavin Larsen (born 1962), New Zealand cricketer
 Gert Larsen (born 1960), Danish curler and coach
 Ingrid Larsen (1912–1997), Danish diver
 Ingrid Larsen (1909–1990), Danish chess player
 Jack Larsen (born 1995), American baseball player
 Jens Larsen (born 1969), Danish volleyball player and coach
 Jeremy Larsen (born 1984), American mixed martial artist
 Josh Larsen (born 1994), Canadian rugby player
 Kyle Larsen (1950–2012), American bridge player
 Lyn Larsen (born 1963), Australian cricketer
 Øjvind Larsen (1882–1960), Danish chess player
 Petter Larsen (born 1986), Finnish rugby Player
 Philip Larsen (born 1989), Danish ice hockey player
 Preben Elkjær Larsen (born 1957), Danish footballer
 Roald Larsen (1898–1959), Norwegian speed skater
 Søren Larsen (born 1981), Danish footballer
 Tore Helge Larsen (1945–2015), Norwegian harness racer
 Tonje Larsen (born 1975), Norwegian handball player
 Uffe Schultz Larsen (1921–2005), Danish sport shooter

In other fields
 Aksel Larsen (1897–1972), Danish politician 
 Alf Larsen (1885–1967), Norwegian poet, essayist and magazine editor
 Anders Larsen (1870–1949), Sami teacher, journalist and writer
 Bryan Larsen (born 1975), American painter
 Christina Höj Larsen (born 1971), Swedish politician
 David Larsen (born 1980), American stage actor
 Emanuel Larsen (1823–1859), Danish painter
 Ernest A. Larsen (born 1932), American politician and educator
 Esper Signius Larsen, Jr. (1879–1961), American petrologist
 Ester Larsen (born 1936), Danish politician and schoolteacher
 Gry Larsen (born 1975), Norwegian politician
 Frederick Niels Larsen (1932–2019), American leader of the Remnant Church of Jesus Christ of Latter Day Saints
 Hanna Astrup Larsen (1873–1945), American writer, editor and translator
 Henrik Sass Larsen (born 1966), Danish politician
 Henry Louis Larsen (1890–1962), American Marine Corps General; Governor of American Samoa and Guam
 Jakob Larsen (1888–1974), an American classical scholar
 Jonathan Z. Larsen (born 1940), American journalist
 Mernet Larsen (born 1940), American artist
 Matt Larsen, American combatives instructor
 Megan Larsen (born 1962), New Zealand-born Australian-based organic skincare entrepreneur
 Mickey Borgfjord Larsen (1971–2003), Danish organized crime figure
 Nella Larsen (1891–1964), American novelist
 Øivind Larsen (born 1938), Norwegian physician 
 Reidar T. Larsen (1923–2012), Norwegian politician
 Rick Larsen (born 1965), member of the US House of Representatives
 Roy E. Larsen (1899–1979), American publishing executive, president of Time magazine
 Sally Larsen (born 1954), American photographer
 Søren Absalon Larsen (1871–1957), Danish physicist, discoverer of the Larsen acoustic feedback effect
 Terje Larsen (1958–2018), Norwegian convicted serial burglar
 Terje Rød-Larsen (born 1947), Norwegian diplomat and politician
 Torben Bjørn Larsen (1944–2015), Danish lepidopterist
 Tove Lindbo Larsen (1928 –2018), Danish politician
 Tryggve Larssen (1887–1967), Norwegian actor

See also
 Larssen
 Larson (surname)
 Larsson
 Lassen (disambiguation)

References

Danish-language surnames
Norwegian-language surnames
Patronymic surnames
Surnames from given names